St. Mark's Coptic Orthodox Cathedral is a Coptic church located in the Abbassia District in Cairo, Egypt. The cathedral is the Seat of the Coptic Orthodox Pope. It was built during the time when Pope Cyril VI of Alexandria was Pope of the Coptic Orthodox Church, and was consecrated on 25 June 1968.

The church is dedicated to St. Mark the Evangelist, an apostle of Jesus and founder of the Coptic Orthodox Church. Relics of his life are kept inside. It was, until 2019, (after the inauguration of the new Nativity Cathedral) the largest cathedral in Africa and the Middle East.

History of the land
The cathedral is located in the place of a village called p-Sovt em-p-Hoi (Coptic: ⲡⲥⲟⲃⲧ ⲙ̀ⲡϩⲟⲓ "the wall of the moat") which had been given to the Coptic Church in 969 by Jawhar. This land was a replacement for the land that was taken from the church to be included in building the Palace of Al-Mu'izz li-Din Allah as part of the planning of the new capital of Egypt, Cairo.

During the twelfth century the area contained ten Coptic churches, but during the rule of Qalawun on 18 February 1280, the churches were destroyed by Muslims who persecuted the Copts. Two churches were subsequently built in the area under the rule of his son.

In 1943, the governorate of Cairo attempted to expropriate the area for public use. This was opposed by the General Congregation Council led by its secretary at the time, Habib Elmasry. The campaign proved successful as the Coptic Church maintained control of the land under the condition that a non-profit building be built on it in the following fifteen years. This condition spurred the building of the cathedral.

Office of the Coptic Orthodox Pope
 
The cathedral is where Pope Tawadros II of Alexandria has his office; thus, security is normally high here. However, on 11 December 2016, during the Muslim festival of Mawlid, the chapel near the cathedral was the venue of an Islamic terrorist attack that killed at least 25 people, most of them women and children. This attack is a copycat of various other earlier attacks against Coptic churches in Egypt.

Architecture

The cathedral is considered a unique example of architectural evolution which includes seven churches of which some have a great historic value such as the Church of St. Rewiss. The Cathedral represents the rapid development of Coptic architecture, as the famous Coptic civil engineer Michel Bakhoum contributed in its structural design. It has a capacity for 5,000 worshipers.

Relics of Saint Mark

Before the completion of the cathedral, the Roman Catholic pontiff of the time, Pope Paul VI, returned part of St. Mark's relics, which were stolen from Egypt in the year 828 to Venice, Italy. These relics were taken to the newly constructed Cathedral, where they were placed in a specially-built shrine brightly decorated with Coptic icons, where they have remained until the present time.

Inauguration  ceremony
The inauguration of the new Saint Mark's Coptic Orthodox Cathedral took place on 25 June 1968 in a ceremony hosted by Pope Cyril VI and attended by Egyptian President Gamal Abdel Nasser and Ethiopian Emperor Haile Selassie, among other foreign clergy members from other churches.

Burials
Athanasius of Alexandria
St Reweis (Teji)
Abouna Mikhail Ibrahim
Metropolitan Samuel

See also

 Botroseya Church bombing / 2016 Cairo Church bombing
2017 Palm Sunday church bombings
List of large Orthodox cathedrals

Notes

References

Mark Cathedral in Cairo
Cathedrals in Cairo
Coptic architecture
Oriental Orthodox congregations established in the 20th century
Cairo
20th-century Oriental Orthodox church buildings
Churches completed in 1968
Church buildings with domes
20th-century churches in Egypt